Eldar Hasanović (born 12 January 1990) is a Bosnian professional footballer who plays as a midfielder for Bahraini Premier League club Sitra.

Club career
Hasanović was born in Sarajevo, to a family of Muslim origin.

He began his career in the FK Željezničar's youth team. After that, he signed with Slovak club MŠK Žilina and won the championship, but made only one appearance, and left the club at the end of the season, before returning to Bosnia and signed with Velež Mostar. 

Hasanović started an impressive season, scoring four goals in the first 7 games of the season, then moved to Čelik Zenica during the season. 

In the summer of 2012, he returned to Željezničar and won the league championship in his first season in the club. On 2 November 2014, he scored his debut goal for the club in a 2-1 loss against fierce city rivals FK Sarajevo.

On 1 July 2015, he joined Bnei Sakhnin to compete in the Israeli Premier League.

In September 2016 he joined Sloboda Tuzla.

In January 2017, he returned to Israel and signed with Maccabi Sha'arayim of the National League. In November 2016, he won the 2016–17 Toto Cup Leumit with Sha'arayim. 

In June 2017, China League One club Dalian Transcendence signed Hasanović. It is believed to be the choice of his former manager, Rusmir Cviko. He scored an amazing header in his first match. After Dalian got relegated to China League Two (3rd ranked competition in China) in November 2018, Hasanović left the club.

On 23 August 2019, he came back to his home country and signed a one-year contract with Radnik Bijeljina. Hasanović made his official debut for Radnik on 31 August 2019, in a 0–1 away league win against Velež Mostar.

On 14 January 2020, Hasanović left Radnik and signed a contract with Indonesian Liga 1 club Persita Tangerang.

On 20 January 2021, he joined Olimpik.

International career
Hasanović represented Bosnia and Herzegovina on various youth levels. Most notably while playing for the under-19 national team.

Career statistics

Club

Honours
Žilina 
Slovak Super Liga: 2009–10 

Željezničar  
 Bosnian Premier League: 2012–13

Maccabi Sha'arayim 
Toto Cup Leumit: 2016–17

References

External links
Eldar Hasanović at Sofascore

1990 births
Living people
Footballers from Sarajevo
Association football midfielders
Bosnia and Herzegovina footballers
Bosnia and Herzegovina youth international footballers
Bosnia and Herzegovina under-21 international footballers
MŠK Žilina players
FK Velež Mostar players
NK Čelik Zenica players
FK Željezničar Sarajevo players
Bnei Sakhnin F.C. players
FK Sloboda Tuzla players
Maccabi Sha'arayim F.C. players
Dalian Transcendence F.C. players
FK Radnik Bijeljina players
Persita Tangerang players
FK Olimpik players
Sitra Club players
Slovak Super Liga players
Premier League of Bosnia and Herzegovina players
Israeli Premier League players
Liga Leumit players
China League One players
Liga 1 (Indonesia) players
Bahraini Premier League players
Bosnia and Herzegovina expatriate footballers
Expatriate footballers in Slovakia
Expatriate footballers in Israel
Expatriate footballers in China
Expatriate footballers in Indonesia
Expatriate footballers in Bahrain
Bosnia and Herzegovina expatriate sportspeople in Slovakia
Bosnia and Herzegovina expatriate sportspeople in Israel
Bosnia and Herzegovina expatriate sportspeople in China
Bosnia and Herzegovina expatriate sportspeople in Indonesia
Bosnia and Herzegovina expatriate sportspeople in Bahrain